The Blind Leading the Naked is the third album by Violent Femmes. It was produced by Jerry Harrison of Talking Heads and released in 1986. The title is a play on the figure of speech "the blind leading the blind."

The Blind Leading the Naked was the band's first album to reach the Billboard chart, peaking at #84, and its only one to chart in Britain.

Production and recording
The band said Leo Kottke and Fred Frith were both persuaded to appear on the album after approaching them at their concerts. "I just went along and asked him if he'd like to come down and try something out in the studio," Ritchie said of Frith.

Members of the band said they were unhappy with the choice of Harrison as producer, with Ritchie saying, "We knew Jerry and he'd seen us live and, uh, he didn't like it... And when I heard the reasons that he didn't like it, well, they were the reasons why we do like it! We didn't think he was right to produce music as weird as ours." Gano further claimed that Harrison had been suggested by Warners, "solely on the basis that he lives in Milwaukee, because we'd stipulated to them that we had to record there. This was outrageous from their point of view."

Reception

AllMusic gave the album a positive review, stating the album was a "more mainstream effort" that "rocks harder" than previous albums. People gave a positive review, stating "the group maintains enough humor and angst to keep even their religious songs fresh.... This third album gives more evidence that the Violent Femmes rank with the very best bands of the 1980s", while singling out the song "Breakin' Hearts" as a highlight.
However, in a retrospective of their debut album, The Atlantic mentions The Blind Leading the Naked is "their first unmitigated disaster, a crassly commercial piece of pandering."

Track listing

Personnel

Violent Femmes
 Gordon Gano – lead vocals, acoustic and electric guitars
 Brian Ritchie – acoustic and electric bass guitars, electric guitar, jaw harp, slide whistle, vocals
 Victor DeLorenzo – drums, percussion, tortoise, vocals

Additional musicians
 Jerry Harrison – keyboards, guitar, melodica
 Fred Frith – homemade instruments, guitar
 Leo Kottke – acoustic 10-string guitar
 Sigmund Snopek III – keyboards
 Peter Balestrieri – alto saxophone
 Steve Mackay – saxophone
 Steve Scales – percussion
 Abdulhamid Alwan – tabla, daf
 Junior Brantley – keyboards
 Jim Liban – harmonica
 Bill Schaefgen – trombone
 Drake Scott – vocalizing

Charts

See also
Ronald Reagan in music

References 

Violent Femmes albums
1986 albums
Albums produced by Jerry Harrison
Slash Records albums